Barry Cogan (born 27 September 1936) is a retired Irish Fianna Fáil politician who served as a Teachta Dála (TD) for 4 years and a Senator for less than one year.

He was elected to Dáil Éireann on his first attempt, at the 1977 general election, when he took the fifth of five seats in the Cork Mid constituency. When that constituency was abolished in boundary changes for the 1981 general election, Cogan stood unsuccessfully in the new Cork South-Central constituency. After his defeat, he was elected to the 15th Seanad Éireann on the Industrial and Commercial Panel.

At the general election in February 1982, he was defeated again in Cork South-Central, and also in the subsequent Seanad election. He stood again the next four general elections, but was never returned to the Oireachtas. At the 1999 local elections he was elected to Cork County Council a councillor for Carrigaline, but served only one term, losing that seat at the 2004 local elections.

In 1985, Cogan was one of the key founders in Carrigaline of what became South Coast Community Television, a community group established to provide British TV channels to Carrigaline and subsequently other areas of County Cork.

References

1936 births
Living people
Fianna Fáil TDs
Members of the 21st Dáil
Members of the 15th Seanad
Local councillors in County Cork
Fianna Fáil senators